Ditaji Kambundji (born 20 May 2002) is a Swiss athlete specialising in the sprint hurdles. She won the bronze medal in the 100 metres hurdles at the 2022 European Championships and bronze for the 60 metres hurdles at the 2023 European Indoor Championships.

Kambundji was the 100 m hurdles 2021 European under-20 champion. She competed in the event at the delayed 2020 Tokyo Olympics in 2021. She is the Swiss indoor record holder for the 60 m hurdles and a five-time national champion.

Personal life
Kambundji was born in Bern to a Congolese father and a Swiss mother. Her older sister is Swiss sprinter Mujinga Kambundji.

Achievements

International competitions

Personal bests
 60 m hurdles – 7.81 (St. Gallen 2023) 
 60 metres indoor – 7.31 (Magglingen 2023)
 100 m hurdles – 12.70 (+0.9 m/s, Eugene, OR 2022)
 100 metres – 11.47 (+1.3 m/s, Langenthal 2022)

National titles
 Swiss Athletics Championships
 100 m hurdles: 2020, 2021
 Swiss Indoor Athletics Championships
 60 m hurdles: 2021, 2022, 2023

References

External links
 

2002 births
Living people
Swiss female hurdlers
Olympic athletes of Switzerland
Athletes (track and field) at the 2020 Summer Olympics
Athletes (track and field) at the 2018 Summer Youth Olympics
Swiss people of Democratic Republic of the Congo descent
Sportspeople from Bern
European Athletics Championships medalists